The Blob is a large mass of relatively warm water in the Pacific Ocean off the coast of North America that was first detected in late 2013 and continued to spread throughout 2014 and 2015. It is an example of a marine heatwave. Sea surface temperatures indicated that the Blob persisted into 2016, but it was initially thought to have dissipated later that year.

By September 2016, the Blob resurfaced and made itself known to meteorologists. The warm water mass was unusual for open ocean conditions and was considered to have played a role in the formation of the unusual weather conditions experienced along the Pacific coast of North America during the same time period. The warm waters of the Blob were nutrient-poor and adversely affected marine life.

In 2019 another scare was caused by a weaker form of the effect referred as "The Blob 2.0" and in 2021 the appearance of "The Southern Blob" at south of the equator near New Zealand has caused a major effect in South America, particularly Chile and Argentina.

Origin
The Blob was first detected in October 2013 and early 2014 by Nicholas Bond and his colleagues at the Joint Institute for the Study of the Atmosphere and Ocean of the University of Washington. It was detected when a large circular body of seawater did not cool as expected and remained much warmer than the average normal temperatures for that location and season.

Bond, then the state climatologist for Washington, coined the term the Blob, with the term first appearing in an article in the monthly newsletter of the Office of the Washington State Climatologist for June 2014.

Description

In February 2014, the temperature of the Blob was around  warmer than what was usual for the time of year. A NOAA scientist noted in September 2014 that, based on ocean temperature records, the North Pacific Ocean had not previously experienced temperatures so warm since climatologists began taking measurements.

In 2015 the atmospheric ridge causing the Blob finally disappeared. The Blob vanished shortly after in 2016. However, in its wake are many species that will take a long time to recover. Although the Blob is gone for now, scientists predict that similar marine heat waves are becoming more common due to the Earth's warming climate. Residual heat from the first blob in addition to warmer temperatures in 2019 lead to a second Blob scare. However, it was quelled by a series of storms that cooled the rising temperatures.

Cause
The immediate cause of the phenomenon was the lower than normal rates of heat loss from the sea to the atmosphere, compounded with lower than usual water circulation resulting in a static upper layer of water. Both of these are attributed to a static high pressure region in the atmosphere, termed the Ridiculously Resilient Ridge, which was formed in the spring of 2014. The lack of air movement impacted the wind-forced currents and the wind-generated stirring of surface waters. These in turn influenced the weather in the American Pacific Northwest from the winter of 2013–2014 onward and may have been associated with the unusually hot summer experienced in the continental American Pacific Northwest in 2014.

The reason for the phenomenon remains unclear, but it is speculated to partially be human caused climate change. Some experts consider that the wedge of warm water portends a cyclical change with the surface waters of the mid-latitude Pacific Ocean flipping from a cold phase to a warm phase in a cycle known as the Pacific decadal oscillation (PDO). This poorly-understood change happens at irregular intervals of years or decades. During a warm phase, the west Pacific becomes cooler and part of the eastern ocean warms; during the cool phase, these changes reverse. Scientists believe a cold phase started in the late 1990s and the arrival of the Blob may have been the start of the next warm phase. The PDO phases may also be related to the likelihood of El Nino events.

NASA climatologist William Patzert predicts that if the PDO is at work here, there will be widespread climatological consequences and southern California and the American south may be in for a period of high precipitation with an increase in the rate of global warming. Another climatologist, Matt Newman of the University of Colorado, does not think the Blob fits the pattern of a shift in the PDO. He believes the unusually warm water is due to the persistent area of high pressure stationary over the northeastern Pacific Ocean. Dan Cayan of the Scripps Institution of Oceanography is unsure about the ultimate cause of the phenomenon, but states "there's no doubt that this anomaly in sea surface temperature is very meaningful".

Effects

Ecosystem disruption
Sea surface temperature anomalies are a physical indicator which adversely affect the zooplankton (mainly copepods) in the northeast Pacific Ocean and specifically in the Coastal Upwelling Domain. Warm waters are much less nutrient-rich than the cold upwelling waters which were normal until recently off the Pacific coast. This resulted in reduced phytoplankton productivity with knock-on effects on the zooplankton which fed on it and the higher levels of the food chain. Species lower in the food web that prefer colder waters, which tend to be fattier, were replaced by warmer water species of lower nutritional value.

The Northwest Fisheries Science Center in Seattle predicted reduced catches of coho and Chinook salmon, a major contributing factor being the raised temperatures of seawater in the Blob. Salmon catches dropped as the fish migrated away having found low levels of zooplankton.

Thousands of sea lion pups have starved in California which lead to forced beachings.
Thousands of Cassin's auklets in Oregon have starved due to lack of food.

Animals that favored warm southern waters were spotted as far north as Alaska, examples being the warm water thresher sharks (Alopias spp) and ocean sunfish (Mola mola). In the spring of 2016, acres of Velella velella were reported in the waters south of the Copper River Delta.

Biologists from the University of Queensland observed the first-ever mass bleaching event for Hawaiian coral reefs in 2014, and attributed it to the blob.

Weather and seasons
Research from the University of Washington found positive temperature anomalies in the northeast Pacific Ocean (upper ~100 m, greater than 2.5 °C, with temperatures at the coast below normal) for the winter period of 2013–2014. Heat loss from the ocean during the winter was suppressed. During spring and summer 2014 the warmer sea surface temperature anomalies reached coastal waters.  The anomaly may have had a significant effect on the unusually warm summer of 2014, with record high temperatures over parts of land in the Pacific Northwest. Offshore sea surface temperatures (SSTs) in the northeast Pacific for the month of February were the greatest at least since the 1980s, possibly as early as 1900. Additionally they found anomalous sea surface pressure SSP, with a peak magnitude approaching 10 hPa, a record high value for the years of 1949–2014.

Canadian senior climatologist David Phillips noted in May 2015 about the coming winter season, "If that blob continues, if it stays warm ... and then you add to that El Nino, it may complement each other and then it may be the year winter is cancelled."

See also
Cold blob (North Atlantic)
Special Report on the Ocean and Cryosphere in a Changing Climate

References

Oceanography
Pacific Ocean
Anomalous weather